"Reconsider Me" is a single from Warren Zevon's 1987 album Sentimental Hygiene. The song failed to chart, but became a live staple in Zevon's concert performances. In 2006, a set of love songs were released under the name: Reconsider Me: The Love Songs.

Personnel
Warren Zevon – acoustic guitar, piano, vocals
Mike Campbell – guitar
Jorge Calderón – backing vocals
Craig Krampf – drums
Tony Levin – bass guitar
Jai Winding – keyboards

Stevie Nicks version

In 1984, Zevon presented "Reconsider Me" to Jimmy Iovine. Iovine gave the song to Stevie Nicks and it was recorded for her 1984 album Mirror, Mirror. The album was pulled from release, and the song was left unreleased until 1998 when Nicks released her box set, Enchanted Nicks said in the Enchanted box set, "Jimmy Iovine brought me this song, I think Jimmy and I were fighting, and for some reason... wasn't in a very "reconsider me" state of mind. I don't think Jimmy ever forgave me for not trusting his judgment." Nicks was given a co-writing credit despite having made only insubstantial lyric changes – a word here and there – and merely moving verses and choruses around. Perhaps the co-credit was due to the anticipation of an actual commercial release for the scrapped 1984 album.

Personnel
Stevie Nicks – vocals, percussion
Don Henley – backing vocals
Waddy Wachtel – guitar
Sharon Celani – backing vocals
Lori Nicks – backing vocals
Bob Glaub – bass guitar
Matt Chamberlain – drums
Patrick Warren – chamberlain
Steve Goldstein – synthesizer
Benmont Tench – piano
Roy Bittan – keyboards

References

External links
Stevie Nicks official site

1984 songs
Stevie Nicks songs
Songs written by Stevie Nicks
Warren Zevon songs
Songs written by Warren Zevon
Song recordings produced by Niko Bolas